Events in the year 1825 in Portugal.

Incumbents
Monarch: John VI

Events

Arts and entertainment

Sports

Births

7 February – Francisco Augusto Metrass, painter (d. 1861). 

20 November – António de Serpa Pimentel, politician (died 1900)

Deaths
May 5 - José Joaquim Champalimaud
August 22 - António Marcelino da Vitória
Christian Adolph Friedrich Eben

References

 
1820s in Portugal
Years of the 19th century in Portugal